The Mk 18 Mod 0 was a 40x46mm grenade launcher used by the United States Navy during the Vietnam War and also the last known hand crank operated firearm since the Gatling gun.  It was replaced by the Mk 19 grenade launcher in service with the United States Armed Forces.

Design
This weapon is a manually-operated, belt-fed. The use of a split breech mechanism allowed the weapon to be light and simple.

Employment
The Mark 18 was used primarily on small boats or in fixed positions such as bunkers; their primary users were the so-called "river rats" and the SEALs.  They could be mounted on M2HB, M60, M1919 tripods, or pintle mounts, but could not be fired without such a mount.

Armored Troop Carrier (LCM)s of the Mobile Riverine Force usually mounted two Mk 18s.

See also
 Comparison of automatic grenade launchers

References

 Mk 18 Mod 0 at Securityarms
 www.quarry.nildram.co.uk
 www.warboats.org

Automatic grenade launchers
40×46mm grenade launchers
Grenade launchers of the United States
Military equipment introduced in the 1960s